Palomeras Bajas is an administrative neighborhood (barrio) of Madrid belonging to the district of Puente de Vallecas. As of 1 February 2020, it has a population of 41,034. The seat of the Assembly of Madrid, the regional legislature of the Community of Madrid, is located in the neighborhood.

References 

Wards of Madrid
Puente de Vallecas